Frederico Flexa (born 12 January 1964) is a Brazilian judoka. He competed at the 1984, 1988 and the 1996 Summer Olympics.

References

1964 births
Living people
Brazilian male judoka
Olympic judoka of Brazil
Judoka at the 1984 Summer Olympics
Judoka at the 1988 Summer Olympics
Judoka at the 1996 Summer Olympics
Sportspeople from Rio de Janeiro (city)
Pan American Games medalists in judo
Pan American Games silver medalists for Brazil
Pan American Games bronze medalists for Brazil
Judoka at the 1983 Pan American Games
Judoka at the 1987 Pan American Games
Judoka at the 1991 Pan American Games
20th-century Brazilian people
21st-century Brazilian people